Zygogramma conjuncta is a species of beetle belonging to the family Zygogramma.

Description
Z. conjuncta is a small leaf beetle with a brown pronotum and yellow elytra marked with elongated brown stripes. The species Z. conjuncta contains two subspecies, Zygogramma conjuncta conjuncta (Rogers, 1856) and Zygogramma conjuncta pallida (Bland, 1864).

Distribution and Habitat
Z. conjuncta is native to North America.

Adult beetles are associated generally with plants of the family Asteraceae) including Ambrosia artemisiifolia, Flourensia cernua, and Helianthus annuus (common sunflower).
 They have also been associated with Brassica campestris (field mustard), Descurainia sophia (tansy mustard), and Atriplex, though not as a food source.

References

Chrysomelinae
Beetles described in 1856
Beetles of North America